Boz Bisheh (also Romanized as Boz Bīsheh and Buz Bishah) is a village in Pishkuh Rural District, in the Central District of Qaen County, South Khorasan Province, Iran. At the 2006 census, its population was 167, in 53 families.

References 

Populated places in Qaen County